Q0906+6930 was the most distant known blazar (redshift 5.47 / 12.2 billion light years) at the time of its discovery in July, 2004. The engine of the blazar is a supermassive black hole (SMBH) approximately 2 billion times the mass of the Sun (the mass of the Milky Way Galaxy is around 1.5 trillion solar masses). The event horizon volume is on the order of 1,000 times that of the Solar System. It is one of the most massive black holes on record.

Distance measurements
The "distance" of a far away galaxy depends on the distance measurement used.  With a redshift of 5.47, light from this active galaxy is estimated to have taken around 12.3 billion light-years to reach Earth. But since this galaxy is receding from Earth at an estimated rate of 285,803 km/s (the speed of light is 299,792 km/s), the present (co-moving) distance to this galaxy is estimated to be around 26 billion light-years (7961 Mpc).

Statistics
Classification: FSRQ
R = 19.9
Power (BL Lac) = 1.4-3.5

External links
arXiv preprint of the Astrophysical Journal paper
Space.com – Massive Black Hole Stumps Researchers

References

 Q0906+6930: The Highest Redshift Blazar The Astrophysical Journal, volume 610, part 2 (2004), pages L9–L11

Ursa Major (constellation)
Q0906+6930
Blazars
Supermassive black holes